John Kingscote (or Kingscotes) was a Bishop of Carlisle. He was selected about August 1462, and consecrated 24 October 1462. He died on 5 November 1463.

Citations

References

 

Bishops of Carlisle
1463 deaths
15th-century English Roman Catholic bishops
Year of birth unknown